Hatiya is a Village Development Committee in Baglung District in the Dhaulagiri Zone of central Nepal. At the time of the 1991 Nepal census it had a population of 6,015 and had 1131 houses in the town.

To Promote local culture Hatiya has one FM radio station Samudayik Radio Galkot - 102.4 MHz Which is a Community radio Station.

References

Populated places in Baglung District